Edvard Linnebo Race (born 22 May 1997) is a Norwegian football defender who currently plays for Raufoss.

He started his youth career in SK Sprint-Jeløy, and also featured for Moss FK before joining Stabæk's junior team while attending the Norwegian College of Elite Sports.

He made his senior debut in the first round of the 2015 Norwegian Football Cup, and then his league debut as an 88th-minute substitute against Bodø/Glimt in November 2015. Race then started his first match in March 2016 against Aalesund.

Despite scoring in the last friendly match before the kickoff of the 2017 season, Race was sent to Kongsvinger in a four-month loan on the last day of the winter transfer window. He returned to Stabæk, but did not play, and ahead of the 2018 season he went on to Raufoss.

Career statistics

References

1997 births
Living people
People from Moss, Norway
Norwegian footballers
Stabæk Fotball players
Eliteserien players
Kongsvinger IL Toppfotball players
Norwegian First Division players
Raufoss IL players
Association football defenders
SK Sprint-Jeløy players
Sportspeople from Viken (county)